is a Japanese novel series written by Ayano Takeda. The story is set in Uji, Kyoto and focuses on the Kitauji High School Music Club, whose concert band is steadily improving thanks to the newly appointed adviser's strict instruction.

A manga adaptation illustrated by Hami was serialized on the Kono Manga ga Sugoi! Web website. Kyoto Animation was in charge of its anime adaptations: it produced two seasons of a television series adaptation in 2015 and 2016, depicting the first high school year of the main character, Kumiko Oumae. Two animated theatrical films titled Liz and the Blue Bird and Sound! Euphonium: The Movie – Our Promise: A Brand New Day, both taking place during Kumiko's second high year, were released in premiered in 2018 and 2019 respectively. A third season focused on Kumiko in her third year of high school has been announced for 2024, preceded by the theatrical OVA Ensemble Contest in Q3 2023.

Plot
The Kitauji High School Concert Band Club had at one time participated in national tournaments and was a championship-caliber school, but after the club's adviser changed, they had not been able to even participate in the qualifying tournament. However, thanks to the newly appointed adviser's strict instruction, the students are steadily improving and build up their strength. As they fight over who plays solos, some students give priority to studying and quit club activities. Finally, the long wished-for day of the competition arrives.

Characters

Main characters

Kumiko, a first-year high school student, is the main protagonist of Sound! Euphonium. She speaks standard Japanese, despite growing up in Kansai. She is easily swayed by the opinions of others and is an indecisive person. She dislikes her personality because she cannot make her wishes known to others nor have the courage to interfere with social affairs. She is a euphonium player in the concert band. She lives near Byodoin Temple with her elder sister and parents.

Reina is a beautiful trumpet player with long black hair. She was a member of the concert band club at the same junior high school as Kumiko. She is a dedicated trumpet player and goes to the music classroom even outside of club activities. Though she has a polite disposition, she is not viewed so well by others because she usually has a surly expression. She cherishes her trumpet, which was given to her by her parents when she was a junior high school student. She has feelings for her teacher Taki.

Asuka is a third-year student and vice president of the concert band club. She plays the euphonium and leads the bass section. Whenever the club is marching, she leads the band as drum major. She is a natural beauty with glasses and has a playful personality. However in the second season, this is revealed to be mostly a facade to hide her true feelings from her classmates.

Taki is the new music teacher in Kitauji High School and serves as the adviser to the concert band club. He is also in charge of Class 5 of the second-year students. He is polite and has a methodical personality. He emphasizes independence in his students, and to this end he pushes them to reach their goal of going to the national competition.

First-year students

Hazuki is a friendly girl who talks innocently. She is Kumiko's classmate and is suntanned because she belonged to the tennis club when she was a junior high school student. She is a beginner at music. She admires the trumpet and joined the concert band club, but ended up playing the tuba, which she calls . She is a bright, perky mood-maker, and the type of person who prefers standing out over supporting others.

 

Sapphire is a girl with soft hair and a delicate constitution. She is often timid due to her lack of self-confidence. She is embarrassed by her own name  , so she tells people to call her "Midori". She is from a junior high school named  which has a competitive concert band club. She plays the upright bass, which she endearingly calls "George", and electric bass.

Shuuichi is a first-year high school student. He is Kumiko's childhood friend, and the two went to the same junior high school. He and Kumiko are not classmates in high school because they are studying different courses. They previously had a falling out, due to Shuuichi having made a snide remark about Kumiko when they were in their third year of junior high school. He was originally a French horn player, but he gets to play the trombone after winning a game of rock-paper-scissors.

A first-year student and Shuuichi's friend. He plays the tenor saxophone.

A first-year student who plays the trumpet.

A first-year student who plays the French horn.

A first-year student who plays the clarinet.

Second-year students

Natsuki is a second-year student who plays the euphonium. She is lazy and often found sleeping, but she works hard when something motivates her. She becomes the band vice president in her third year.

Yuuko is a second-year student who plays the trumpet. She adores Kaori and has a begrudging friendship with Natsuki. She becomes the band president in her third year.

Mizore is a quiet second-year student who plays the oboe. She was friends with Nozomi in middle school.

Nozomi is a second-year student who plays the flute. She dropped out of band in her first year.

A second-year student who is a tall, calm, and taciturn youth. He plays the tuba and sousaphone.

A second-year student and Takuya's girlfriend. She also plays the tuba and sousaphone.

A second-year student who plays the trumpet. In her third year, she was tasked alongside Kumiko to instruct and manage the new first-year members of the band.

A second-year student who plays the trombone. In her third year, she plays the bass trombone and becomes the trombone section leader.

A second-year student who is a percussionist as the timpani player. She can also play the harp.

Third-year students

Haruka is a third-year student and president of the concert band. She plays the baritone saxophone and leads the saxophone section. She is a strong-minded character, but has low self-esteem.

Kaori is a third-year student. She has deep black hair and a gentle character, making her quite popular in the band. She plays the trumpet and is the section leader, in addition to being the band accountant.

Aoi is a childhood friend of Kumiko, and she is two years her senior. The two often played together, as they lived in the same neighborhood. She and Kumiko drifted apart in junior high school. They are reunited in the concert band, although they do not talk much. She plays the tenor saxophone. She quit the band to focus on her college entrance exams.

A third-year student who is the concertmaster and leader of the clarinet section.

A third-year student who leads the flute and piccolo section.

A third-year student who leads the horn section.

A third-year student who leads the trombone section.

A third-year student who leads the percussion section. He plays the snare drum and the drum kit. His nickname is "Knuckle".

A third-year student who leads the bassoon and oboe section. She plays the bassoon.

A third-year student who is the band's photographer. She plays the clarinet.

A third-year student who is the band's sheet music librarian. She plays the piccolo.

A third-year student who is the band's alumni coordinator. She plays the flute. Her nickname is "Chabudai" (ちゃぶ台, lit. "Small table").

A third-year student who plays the alto saxophone. Her lucky charm is written "L.O."

A third-year student who plays the bass clarinet.

A third-year student who plays the trombone. She and Hideri are dating.

New first-year students

A new first-year student who plays the euphonium. She gives off a good impression to everyone who sees her, but there is a hidden side to her always-polite personality.

A new first-year student who plays the tuba and is quite tall. She takes everything very seriously and is a bit antisocial.

A new first-year student who plays the tuba and is quite short. Like Hazuki, she is very friendly.

A new first-year student who plays the double bass. He hates being called by his surname.

Others

Michie is Kumiko's homeroom teacher and is the vice-advisor of the concert band. She is known as an intimidating teacher.

Mamiko is Kumiko's older sister. She is a college student and was a trombone player.

Akiko is Kumiko and Mamiko's mother. Her given name is not mentioned in the original novels.

Akemi is Asuka's mother. She tried to make Asuka quit the band.

Azusa is Kumiko's friend from junior high school. She plays the trombone. She is the protagonist of the Rikka-centric spinoff novels.

Kohaku is Sapphire's little sister. She is a character created for the anime television series and appears in the eighth episode. Her name means "amber" in Japanese.

A percussion specialist and longtime friend of Noboru Taki's.

A woodwind specialist and longtime friend of Noboru Taki's.

Shindo is Asuka's father. Asuka's parents divorced when Asuka was two years old. He is a prominent euphonist and author of book  for beginner euphonists. When Asuka was in first grade, he sent her the euphonium she now plays and a notebook full of euphonium pieces entitled .

Media

Novels
Sound! Euphonium is a 319-page novel written by Ayano Takeda, and features cover art drawn by Nikki Asada. Takarajimasha published the novel on December 5, 2013. Two sequel novels were released on March 5 and April 4, 2015. In addition, a short story collection was released on May 25, 2015. In 2016, a spin-off novel was released in two volumes on August 4 and September 6. Another spin-off novel was released on October 6, 2016. A two-part sequel to the novels was released in August and October 2017; the story takes place in Kumiko's second year and Mizore's third year of high school. Another short story collection was released on April 5, 2018. Two follow-up novel volumes focused on Kumiko's third and final year on high school were released in April and May 2019.

Yen Press released the first volume of the novel series in English in June 2017.

Manga
A manga adaptation of the first novel illustrated by Hami was serialized on the Kono Manga ga Sugoi! Web website between November 28, 2014 and October 30, 2015. Takarajimasha published three tankōbon volumes between April 3 and November 20, 2015. A manga adaptation of the second novel followed, and the first volume was released on September 8, 2016; the second volume was released on October 11, 2016. A manga adaptation of the third novel followed; the first volume was released July 20, 2017, and the second volume on August 26, 2017.

Anime

Season 1
A 13-episode anime television series adaptation of the first volume of the novel series, directed by Tatsuya Ishihara, written by Jukki Hanada, and produced by Kyoto Animation, aired in Japan between April 8 and July 1, 2015. Naoko Yamada served as series production director. The anime is licensed by Ponycan USA in North America, and by Anime Limited in the United Kingdom. The seventh DVD/BD volume, released on December 16, 2015, bundled an original video animation (OVA) episode titled . Kyoto Animation produced an anime film retelling the events of the television series, which premiered on April 23, 2016.

Season 2
A second season of the television series began airing on October 6, 2016. Euphonium". A short anime, titled , was bundled with the second season's first home video release volume, which was released on December 21, 2016. A second anime film retelling the events of the second season was released on September 30, 2017.

Films
Two new animated films telling the events of Kumiko's second year at Kitauji High were scheduled for release in 2018. The first film, directed by Naoko Yamada and written by Reiko Yoshida, titled , focuses on Nozomi and Mizore and premiered on April 21, 2018. Theatrical distributor Eleven Arts released the film in theaters on November 9, 2018 in the United States. Shout! Factory released it on home video on March 5, 2019. The second film, titled  and originally scheduled for release in 2018, is directed by Tatsuya Ishihara and focuses on Kumiko as a student in her second year and premiered on April 19, 2019. The film was released in select US theaters on July 11, 2019, and the English dub debuted on July 15, 2019. Eleven Arts released the film under the title of Sound! Euphonium—Our Promise: A Brand New Day. The English dub has a different voice cast compared to Liz and the Blue Bird, though Sarah Anne Williams, Ryan Bartley and Megan Harvey reprised their roles as Natsuki, Satomi and Yuko, respectively. The film was released on a DVD/Blu-Ray set on June 2, 2020 from Shout Factory.

Theatrical OVA 
Along with re-confirmation of the third season, the theatrical OVA Hibike! Euphonium: ~Ensemble Contest~, was announced in 2022, slated to be released in Q3 2023. Tatsuya Ishihara is returning to direct the OVA.

Season 3
A new anime project was announced in 2019. It focuses on Kumiko as a student in her third year. In 2022, it was announced that the third  season is scheduled to be released in 2024.

Music
Wind ensemble music for both seasons were performed by the 2014  of the Senzoku Gakuen College of Music.

Reception
In April 2018, it was reported that the novels had more than 1.4 million copies in print in Japan.

The series has often been criticized by Western viewers for perceived queerbaiting with regards to the relationship between lead characters Kumiko Oumae and Reina Kousaka. Crunchyroll's Twitter account acknowledged the pairing by tweeting a screenshot from the show, which was still airing and being officially simulcast by the service at the time, in the wake of the legalization of same-sex marriage in the United States.

Notes

Director credits

References

External links
 
 
 
 

2013 Japanese novels
2015 anime television series debuts
2016 anime television series debuts
Bandai Namco franchises
Crunchyroll anime
Kyoto Animation
Music in anime and manga
Novels about music
Novels set in high schools and secondary schools
Novels set in Kyoto Prefecture
School life in anime and manga
Television shows based on Japanese novels
Yen Press titles
Yonkoma